Eino Jaakko "Jaska" Saariluoma (born 25 July 1967) is a Finnish actor, writer, director, stand-up comedian and television host. Saariluoma graduated from Theatre Academy Helsinki in 1994 and has worked for several theatres, on television and in films. He is best known as a host in television programs such as Huuma and Putous.

Selected filmography

In films
Ihmiselon ihanuus ja kurjuus (1988)
Akvaariorakkaus (1992)
Sairaan kaunis maailma (1997)
Uuno Turhapuro – This Is My Life (2004)
Risto (2011)

On television
City vs Country (TV series)
W-tyyli (2004)
Huuma (2005–2007)
Viinin viemää (2006–2007)
Tuntemattomat (2008)
Putous (2010–2014)
Tauno Tukevan sota (2010)
Paparazzit (2012)
Kingi (2015)
Bordertown (2016)
Suurmestari (fi) (2020)

References

External links

20th-century Finnish male actors
Finnish male film actors
1967 births
Finnish male television actors
Living people
Male actors from Helsinki
21st-century Finnish male actors